Luke Mishu (born June 26, 1991) is a retired American soccer player who last played for D.C. United in Major League Soccer.

Career

College
Mishu spent his entire college career at the University of Notre Dame.  He made a total of 75 appearances for the Fighting Irish and tallied 12 assists.

Professional
Mishu went undrafted in the 2015 MLS SuperDraft.  On March 6, 2015, he signed a professional contract with D.C. United.  Two weeks later, he was sent on loan to USL affiliate club Richmond Kickers.  He made his professional debut on March 28 in a 2–2 draw against the Wilmington Hammerheads.

Mishu announced his retirement from the game on December 6, 2016, in hopes of pursuing a business career.

References

External links

Notre Dame Fighting Irish bio

1991 births
Living people
American soccer players
Notre Dame Fighting Irish men's soccer players
D.C. United players
Richmond Kickers players
Association football defenders
Soccer players from Tennessee
Major League Soccer players
USL Championship players
Sportspeople from Knoxville, Tennessee
Undrafted Major League Soccer players